The 2023 Ruichang China Masters was a badminton tournament that took place in the Ruichang Sports Park Gym at Ruichang, China, from 14 to 19 March 2023. The tournament had a total prize pool of $120,000.

Tournament
The 2023 Ruichang China Masters was the sixth tournament of the 2023 BWF World Tour. This was the first edition of the Ruichang China Masters. It was organized by the Chinese Badminton Association with sanction from the Badminton World Federation.

Venue
This tournament was held at the Ruichang Sports Park Gym in Ruichang, Jiangxi, China.

Point distribution
Below is the point distribution table for each phase of the tournament based on the BWF points system for the BWF Tour Super 100 event.

Prize pool
The total prize money was US$120,000 with the distribution of the prize money in accordance with BWF regulations.

Men's singles

Seeds 

 Christian Adinata (withdrew)
 Meiraba Luwang Maisnam (third round)
 Leong Jun Hao (second round)
 Uriel Canjura (second round)
 Lu Chia-hung (second round)
 Ikhsan Rumbay (withdrew)
 Su Li-yang (quarter-finals)
 Ade Resky Dwicahyo (second round)

Finals

Top half

Section 1

Section 2

Bottom half

Section 3

Section 4

Women's singles

Seeds 

 Tanya Hemanth (first round)
 Ester Nurumi Tri Wardoyo (withdrew)
 Lin Hsiang-ti (champion)
 Pitchamon Opatniput (second round)
 Daniella Gonda (second round)
 Stephanie Widjaja (withdrew)
 Liang Ting-yu (second round)
 Gao Fangjie (semi-finals)

 Finals 

 Top half 
 Section 1 

 Section 2 

 Bottom half 
 Section 3 

 Section 4 

 Men's doubles 
 Seeds 

 Tanadon Punpanich / Wachirawit Sothon (first round)
 Pharanyu Kaosamaang / Worrapol Thongsa-Nga (semi-finals)
 Rayhan Fadillah / Rahmat Hidayat (withdrew)
 Nur Mohd Azriyn Ayub / Low Juan Shen (withdrew)
 Choong Hon Jian / Goh Sze Fei (quarter-finals)
 Goh V Shem / Lim Khim Wah (quarter-finals) Chen Boyang / Liu Yi (champions) Junaidi Arif / Yap Roy King (quarter-finals)

 Finals 

 Top half 
 Section 1 

 Section 2 

 Bottom half 
 Section 3 

 Section 4 

 Women's doubles 
 Seeds 

 Hsieh Pei-shan / Tseng Yu-chi (semi-finals)
 Aminath Nabeeha Abdul Razzaq / Fathimath Nabaaha Abdul Razzaq (first round)
 Keisha Fatimah Az Zahra / Era Maftuha (first round)
 Cheng Su Hui / Cheng Su Yin (second round)
 Go Pei Kee / Valeree Siow (quarter-finals)
 Luo Xumin / Zhou Xinru (quarter-finals)
 Chung Kan-yu / Liang Ting-yu (second round)
 Li Yijing / Wang Yiduo (second round)

 Finals 

 Top half 
 Section 1 

 Section 2 

 Bottom half 
 Section 3 

 Section 4 

 Mixed doubles 
 Seeds  Jiang Zhenbang / Wei Yaxin (champions)' Cheng Xing / Chen Fanghui (final) Hussein Zayan Shaheed / Fathimath Nabaaha Abdul Razzaq (first round) Lu Ming-che / Chung Kan-yu (second round) Tanupat Viriyangkura / Ornnicha Jongsathapornparn (second round) Guo Xinwa / Zhang Chi (quarter-finals) Yap Roy King / Valeree Siow (quarter-finals) Choong Hon Jian / Go Pei Kee (first round)''

Finals

Top half

Section 1

Section 2

Bottom half

Section 3

Section 4

References

External links
 Tournament link

Ruichang China Masters
Ruichang China Masters
Ruichang China Masters